Dronley railway station served the village of Dronley, Angus, Scotland from 1860 to 1955 on the Dundee and Newtyle Railway.

History 
The station opened on 16 October 1860 by the Dundee and Newtyle Railway. The railway also passed through nearby Auchterhouse. There was a goods siding to the west. The station closed to both passengers and goods traffic on 10 January 1955.

References

External links 

Disused railway stations in Angus, Scotland
Former Caledonian Railway stations
Railway stations in Great Britain opened in 1860
Railway stations in Great Britain closed in 1955
1860 establishments in Scotland
1955 disestablishments in Scotland